The 2015 Women's Basketball Invitational (WBI) was a single-elimination tournament of 16 National Collegiate Athletic Association (NCAA) Division I teams that did not participate in the 2015 NCAA Women's Division I Basketball Tournament or 2015 Women's National Invitation Tournament. The field of 16 was announced on March 16, 2015.  All games were hosted by the higher seed throughout the tournament, unless the higher seed's arena was unavailable. The championship game was hosted by the school with the higher RPI. The tournament was won by the Louisiana–Lafayette Ragin' Cajuns.

Bracket
Top seed of match-up will get home site, not including Furman vs. McNeese State.

West Region

East Region

WBI Championship Game

See also
 2015 NCAA Women's Division I Basketball Tournament
 2015 Women's National Invitation Tournament
 Women's Basketball Invitational

References

Women's Basketball Invitational
Women's Basketball Invitational